Edward J. Rice (October 23, 1918 – August 8, 2001) was an American  author, publisher, photojournalist and painter, born in Brooklyn, New York to Edward J. Rice, Sr. and Elsie (Becker) Rice. He was best known as a close friend and biographer of Thomas Merton.  Rice wrote more than 20 books, including Captain Sir Richard Francis Burton, a best-selling 1990 biography of the famous 19th-century explorer, and was the founder (1953) of Jubilee magazine.

Life
Rice attended Columbia University, where he became close friends with Merton, Robert Lax, and Robert Giroux (who later co-founded Farrar, Straus and Giroux). Rice was editor of the Jester humor magazine in his senior year; he graduated in 1940. He stood godfather for both Merton and Lax when each converted to Catholicism; Merton in 1938, and Lax five years later.

Rice chronicled his friendship with Merton in the 1970 book The Man in the Sycamore Tree: The Good Times and Hard Life of Thomas Merton. Also in 1970, he published John Frum He Come, a book documenting the South Pacific cargo cults.

Rice died August 8, 2001, in Sagaponack, New York USA.

References

External links
Ed Rice profile by Mary Cummings, published in the Columbia alumni magazine, May 2001
Obituary

1918 births
2001 deaths
American photojournalists
20th-century American biographers
People from Brooklyn
People from Suffolk County, New York
Journalists from New York City
Historians from New York (state)
Columbia College (New York) alumni